Shantinath temple may refer to:

 Shantinatha Basadi, Jinanathapura in Karnataka
 Shantinatha temple, Khajuraho in Madhya Pradesh